The 1997–98 Drexel Dragons men's basketball team represented Drexel University  during the 1997–98 NCAA Division I men's basketball season. The Dragons, led by 7th year head coach Bill Herrion, played their home games at the Daskalakis Athletic Center and were members of the America East Conference (AEC).

The team finished the season 13–15, and finished in 5th place in the AEC in the regular season.

Roster

Schedule

|-
!colspan=9 style="background:#F8B800; color:#002663;"| Regular season
|-

|-
!colspan=9 style="background:#F5CF47; color:#002663;"| AEC tournament

Awards
Mike DeRocckis
AEC All-Conference Second Team
AEC Player of the Week

Joe Linderman
AEC All-Conference First Team
AEC All-Championship Team
AEC Player of the Week

Petrick Sanders
AEC All-Rookie Team
AEC Rookie of the Week

Stephen Starks
AEC Rookie of the Week

References

Drexel Dragons men's basketball seasons
Drexel
1997 in sports in Pennsylvania
1998 in sports in Pennsylvania